Jerry Allan Rollins (born March 22, 1955 in New Westminster, British Columbia) is a Canadian retired professional ice hockey defenceman. He played in the  World Hockey Association (WHA) for the Toronto Toros, Birmingham Bulls, Phoenix Roadrunners, and the Indianapolis Racers.  Rollins is the son of former NHL, WHA, and WHL player and coach Al Rollins.

Career statistics

External links
 

1955 births
Living people
Birmingham Bulls players
Canadian ice hockey defencemen
Detroit Red Wings draft picks
Flin Flon Bombers players
Sportspeople from New Westminster
Indianapolis Racers players
Kalamazoo Wings (1974–2000) players
Philadelphia Firebirds (AHL) players
Phoenix Roadrunners (WHA) players
Toronto Toros draft picks
Toronto Toros players
Winnipeg Clubs players
Ice hockey people from British Columbia
Canadian expatriate ice hockey players in the United States